Bagherzadeh is an Iranian surname. Notable people with the surname include:

Firouz Bagherzadeh (1930–2021), Iranian archaeologist and art scholar
Mansoureh Khojasteh Bagherzadeh (born 1947), wife of Supreme Leader of Iran Ali Khamenei
Nader Bagherzadeh, American engineer
Gelareh Bagherzadeh, medical student and murder victim